The Gallows Man (Swedish: Galgmannen) is a 1945 Swedish historical drama film directed by Gustaf Molander and starring Edvin Adolphson, Wanda Rothgardt and Inga Tidblad. The film's sets were designed by the art director Arne Åkermark.

Main cast
 Edvin Adolphson as 	Col. Christoffer Toll
 Wanda Rothgardt as 	Maria
 Inga Tidblad as 	Elizavetha
 Hilda Borgström as 	Gamla Kristin
 Gunnel Broström as Natasja
 Hugo Björne as Russian General
 Olof Molander as 	The Rabbi
 Sigge Fürst as 	Strong Man

References

Bibliography 
 Qvist, Per Olov & von Bagh, Peter. Guide to the Cinema of Sweden and Finland. Greenwood Publishing Group, 2000.

External links 
 

1945 films
1945 drama films
1940s Swedish-language films
Films directed by Gustaf Molander
Swedish black-and-white films
Swedish historical drama films
1940s historical drama films
Films set in the 19th century
1940s Swedish films